The S-IVB (pronounced "S-four-B") was the third stage on the Saturn V and second stage on the Saturn IB launch vehicles. Built by the Douglas Aircraft Company, it had one J-2 rocket engine. For lunar missions it was fired twice: first for Earth orbit insertion after second stage cutoff, and then for translunar injection (TLI).

History
The S-IVB evolved from the upper stage of the Saturn I rocket, the S-IV, and was the first stage of the Saturn V to be designed. The S-IV used a cluster of six engines but used the same fuels as the S-IVB – liquid hydrogen and liquid oxygen. It was also originally meant to be the fourth stage of a planned rocket called the C-4, hence the name S-IV.

Eleven companies submitted proposals for being the lead contractor on the stage by the deadline of 29 February 1960. NASA administrator T. Keith Glennan decided on 19 April that Douglas Aircraft Company would be awarded the contract. Convair had come a close second but Glennan did not want to monopolize the liquid hydrogen-fueled rocket market as Convair was already building the Centaur rocket stage.

In the end the Marshall Space Flight Center decided to use the C-5 rocket (later called the Saturn V), which had three stages and would be topped with an uprated S-IV called the S-IVB which instead of using a cluster of engines would have a single J-2 engine. Douglas was awarded the contract for the S-IVB because of the similarities between it and the S-IV. At the same time it was decided to create the C-IB rocket (Saturn IB) that would also use the S-IVB as its second stage and could be used for testing the Apollo spacecraft in Earth orbit.

Configuration

Douglas built two distinct versions of the S-IVB, the 200 series and the 500 series. The 200 series was used by the Saturn IB and differed from the 500 in that it did not have a flared interstage and it had less helium pressurization on board since it did not have to be restarted. In the 500 series, the interstage needed to flare out to match the larger diameter of the S-IC and S-II stages of the Saturn V. The 200 series also had three solid rockets for separating the S-IVB stage from the S-IB stage during launch. On the 500 series this was reduced to two, and two small Auxiliary Propulsion System (APS) thruster modules were added as ullage motors for restarting the J-2 engine and to provide attitude control during coast phases of flight.

The S-IVB carried  of liquid oxygen (LOX), massing . It carried  of liquid hydrogen (LH2), massing . Empty mass was

Auxiliary Propulsion System 
Attitude control was provided by J-2 engine gimbaling during powered flight and by the two APS modules during coast. APS modules were used for three-axis control during coast phases, roll control during J-2 firings, and ullage for the second ignition of the J-2 engine. Each APS module contained two  thrusters providing thrust for roll and pitch, another  thruster for yaw, and one  thruster for ullage. Each module contained its own propellant tanks of  dinitrogen tetroxide and  monomethyl hydrazine as well as compressed helium to pressurize its propellants.

Uses
A surplus S-IVB tank, serial number 212, was converted into the hull for the Skylab, the first American space station. Skylab was launched on a Saturn V on May 14, 1973, and it eventually reentered the atmosphere on July 11, 1979. A second S-IVB, serial number 515, was also converted into a backup Skylab, but this one never flew.

During the missions of Apollo 13, Apollo 14, Apollo 15, Apollo 16, and Apollo 17, the S-IVB stages were crashed into the Moon to perform seismic measurements used for characterizing the lunar interior.

Stages built

(* See List of artificial objects on the Moon for location.)

Derivatives

The second stage of the Ares I rocket and the proposed Earth Departure Stage (EDS) would have had some of the characteristics of the S-IVB stage, as both would have had an uprated J-2 engine, called the J-2X, with the latter performing the same functions as that of the Series 500 version of the stage (placing the payload into orbit, and later firing the spacecraft into trans-lunar space).

The MS-IVB was a proposed modification of the S-IVB that would have been used on a Mars flyby, but it was never produced.

See also
S-IC
S-II
S-IV
Saturn IB
Saturn V
Apollo (spacecraft)
List of artificial objects on the Moon

References
 Marshall Space Flight Center, Apollo Systems Description Volume II - Saturn Launch Vehicles, 1 February 1964. (Archived copy, pdf)

External links
 NASA New Reference: Saturn third stage

Apollo program
Rocket stages
Impactor spacecraft